Carolyn Swords (born July 19, 1989) is an American former basketball player.

She previously played for PF Umbertide in Italy and the Sydney Uni Flames in Australia.

WNBA
Swords was selected the second round of the 2011 WNBA Draft (15th overall) by the Chicago Sky.

She has played overseas in Istanbul and in Italy with PF Umbertide.

Swords signed with the New York Liberty on February 2, 2015.

On January 30, 2017, Swords was traded to the Seattle Storm in a three-team trade.

On February 1, 2018, Swords signed a free agent contract with the Las Vegas Aces. She briefly retired from WNBA in February 2020 to join the Aces' front office but came out of retirement to resign with the Aces in May 2020 when it was announced that center Park Ji-su would sit out the 2020 season to train in South Korea.

After not playing in the 2021 season, Nike announced its hiring of Swords in January 2022, ending her WNBA career. She subsequently moved to Portland, Oregon.

Career statistics

WNBA

|-
| style="text-align:left;"| 2011
| style="text-align:left;"| Chicago
| 29 || 4 || 7.5 || .528 || – || .875 || 1.8 || 0.3 || 0.2 || 0.2 || 0.6 || 2.7
|-
| style="text-align:left;"| 2012
| style="text-align:left;"| Chicago
| 30 || 9 || 11.1 || .571 || – || .682 || 3.2 || 0.3 || 0.4 || 0.5 || 0.6 || 4.0
|-
| style="text-align:left;"| 2013
| style="text-align:left;"| Chicago
| 16 || 2 || 11.3 || .619 || – || .778 || 2.6 || 0.6 || 0.5 || 0.8 || 0.9 || 3.7
|-
| style="text-align:left;"| 2015
| style="text-align:left;"| New York
| 34 || 22 || 15.0 || .508 || – || .809 || 4.0 || 0.6 || 0.5 || 0.7 || 1.1 || 5.1
|-
| style="text-align:left;"| 2016
| style="text-align:left;"| New York
| 34 || 34 || 17.5 || .571 || – || .686 || 4.6 || 0.7 || 0.2 || 0.6 || 1.0 || 5.2
|-
| style="text-align:left;"| 2017
| style="text-align:left;"| Seattle
| 30 || 0 || 8.7 || .545 || – || .773 || 1.5 || 0.3 || 0.2 || 0.2 || 0.8 || 2.6
|-
| style="text-align:left;"| 2018
| style="text-align:left;"| Las Vegas
| 26 || 12 || 14.5 || .557 || – || .875 || 4.7 || 0.9 || 0.2 || 0.7 || 0.8 || 3.9
|-
| style="text-align:left;"| 2019
| style="text-align:left;"| Las Vegas
| 29 || 4 || 8.9 || .438 || – || .846 || 2.2 || 0.3 || 0.2 || 0.1 || 0.6 || 2.6
|-
| style="text-align:left;"| 2020
| style="text-align:left;"| Las Vegas
| 22 || 2 || 17.5 || .460 || – || .773 || 4.6 || 0.9 || 0.2 || 0.1 || 0.8 || 2.9
|- class="sortbottom"
| style="text-align:left;"| Career
| style="text-align:left;"| 9 years, 4 teams
| 250 || 109 || 12.5 || .534 || – || .781 || 3.3 || 0.5 || 0.3 || 0.4 || 0.8 || 3.7
|}

College

Source

References

External links
Boston College Eagles bio

1989 births
Living people
American expatriate basketball people in Australia
American expatriate basketball people in Italy
American expatriate basketball people in Turkey
American women's basketball players
Basketball players from Massachusetts
Boston College Eagles women's basketball players
Centers (basketball)
Chicago Sky draft picks
Chicago Sky players
Las Vegas Aces players
Lincoln-Sudbury Regional High School alumni
New York Liberty players
Nike, Inc. people
Seattle Storm players